Myndy Crist (born February 5, 1971) is an American actress who has appeared in more than 50 films and television series. In 2019, she received a Jury Best Actress 
Award at the 2019 Riverside International Film Festival for her role in the 2018 film Wake.

Early life and Career
Crist grew up in Marin County, California, and graduated from the UCLA School of Theater and Film. Her first onscreen role was in 1995 in an episode of Living Single, and within a few years she was playing supporting roles in films like Gun Shy (2000), Chain of Fools (2000) and Hanging Up (2000). In 2002, she starred as Janet LeClaire in the short-lived TV drama, Breaking News.

More recently, Crist has appeared in TV shows such as Satisfaction (2014), Major Crimes (2015), Code Black (2016) and The Rookie (2019). She had a supporting role in the 2013 film, Dark Skies, and a starring role in the 2018 film, Wake.

Personal life
Crist is married to actor Josh Stamberg. The couple have two daughters, one of whom is named Vivian.

Partial filmography

Film

Television

References

External links

1975 births
American film actresses
Actresses from Detroit
Actresses from Georgia (U.S. state)
Living people
20th-century American actresses
21st-century American actresses
American television actresses
Actresses from the San Francisco Bay Area
People from Marin County, California
UCLA Film School alumni